The futsal tournament at the 2021 Southeast Asian Games is scheduled to be held from 10 to 20 May 2022 in Vietnam. All matches will be held at Hà Nam Gymnasium in Phủ Lý. Hà Nam Province.

Venue

Participating nations

Draw
No group draw was held for futsal as there are only 5 teams in both tournament, so all teams are automatically drawn to one group. Instead, teams are only drawn for scheduling purposes.

Competition format
Both tournaments will be held in Round robin format; the team with the best record wins the gold medal.

Men's tournament

Women's tournament

Medal summary

Medal table

Medalists

See also
 Football at the 2021 Southeast Asian Games 
 2021 Southeast Asian Games

References

Futsal at the 2021 Southeast Asian Games